Anampses femininus, the blue-striped orange tamarin, 
is a fish found in the Pacific Ocean including Australia and New Caledonia to Easter Island.

References

Blue-striped orange tamarin
Fish described in 1972
Taxa named by John Ernest Randall